Marcia Ann Strassman (April 28, 1948 – October 24, 2014) was an American actress and singer. She played Nurse Margie Cutler on M*A*S*H, Julie Kotter on Welcome Back, Kotter, and Diane Szalinski in the film Honey, I Shrunk the Kids (1989).

Life and career
Strassman was born in New York City and raised in Passaic, New Jersey. Among her earliest acting credits was an appearance in an episode of The Patty Duke Show. In 1963, at age 15, she succeeded Liza Minnelli in the role of Ethel Hofflinger in the Off-Broadway musical Best Foot Forward.

In 1967, she became a recording artist for Uni Records. Her debut single, "The Flower Children", was a top-40 hit in many West Coast U.S. markets, hitting #4 in San Diego and #2 in San Francisco; the track also hit #3 in Vancouver, British Columbia (both at CKLG 730 AM and CFUN 1410 AM in July 1967). However, the single failed to break out nationally in either country; the record stalled at #105 in the United States, and just sneaked into RPM's Top 100 for Canada, peaking at #95. The song also reached #95 on Cashbox Top 100 Singles chart 

Her follow-up release, "The Groovy World of Jack and Jill", charted in Denver, Colorado, but virtually nowhere else. A third single, "Star Gazer" (1968) (produced by Kim Fowley), failed to chart anywhere and brought Strassman's brief recording career to a close. Returning to acting after a gap of a few years, she landed the recurring role of Nurse Margie Cutler in six early episodes of M*A*S*H.

She landed the role of Julie Kotter, the wife of title character high school teacher Gabe Kotter (Gabe Kaplan) on the ABC comedy series Welcome Back, Kotter in 1975. The series lasted four years. Strassman was told that Kaplan wanted her off the series, and stated in an interview that working on the series made her "miserable". Kaplan read the interview and realized series producer James Komack was separately telling the two actors they didn't like each other, and Kaplan informed Strassman that he actually wanted more balance between Kotter's work and home environments, which would afford her the chance to do more on the series. Kaplan, a guest host on The Tonight Show that week, had Strassman on to tell the story as an interview guest; she recalled the incident decades later on a Biography Channel special about the history of Kotter.

In the 1970s, Strassman did guest spots on Time Express, The Rockford Files, and The Love Boat, among other shows. In 1980, she starred as Lenina Crowne in a television production of Aldous Huxley's Brave New World. She co-starred in the short-lived sitcom Good Time Harry that year. She guest-starred on the Magnum, P.I. episode "Heal Thyself", where she played Dr. Karen Harmon, a former nurse with whom the title character served in Vietnam. In 1982, she played Maria Giannin in the romantic comedy Soup for One.

In 1989–90, she had a co-starring role on the 21 Jump Street spin-off, Booker, starring Richard Grieco in the title role. She guest starred on Murder, She Wrote in 1996. Strassman had movie roles as Rick Moranis's wife in Honey, I Shrunk the Kids (1989) and Honey, I Blew Up the Kid (1992). In 1994, she reprised her role from those movies in the 3-D film spin-off Honey, I Shrunk the Audience! She later went on to play Nancy Sterngood on the television series Tremors (2003).

Death
In March 2007, Strassman was diagnosed with advanced breast cancer that had spread to her bones. Her memoir, in which she discussed her life, career and illness, was published in 2008. Strassman died of the disease at her home in Sherman Oaks, California, on October 24, 2014. She was 66 years old. She had a daughter, Elizabeth Collector (from her 1984 to 1989 marriage to Robert Collector).

Filmography

Movies

Television

Discography
 "The Flower Children" / "Out of the Picture" (1967)
 "The Groovy World of Jack & Jill" / "The Flower Shop" (1967)
 "Self-Analysis" / "Star Gazer" (1968)

Bibliography

Biography

References

External links

 
 
 
 
 Marcia Strassman(Aveleyman)

1948 births
2014 deaths
American child actresses
American film actresses
American musical theatre actresses
American television actresses
American women singers
Actresses from New Jersey
Uni Records artists
Deaths from cancer in California
Deaths from breast cancer
Musicians from Passaic, New Jersey
Singers from New Jersey
20th-century American actresses
21st-century American actresses